Athletics at the 2000 Summer Paralympics comprised a total of 234 events, 165 for men and 69 for women. Athletes were classified according to the extent and type of their disability.

 Classes 11-13: visually impaired athletes
 Class 20: intellectually disabled athletes
 Classes 32-38: athletes with cerebral palsy; classes 32 to 34 competed while in wheelchairs
 Classes 42-46: amputees and those with other disabilities (les autres)
 Classes 51-58: athletes with spinal cord disabilities; these classes competed while in wheelchairs

Class numbers were preceded by a "T" for track events, an "F" for field events, and a "P" for the pentathlon. Lower respective class numbers corresponded to more severe disability. An exception to this classification scheme arose for athletes with severe cerebral palsy competing in field events; there were no F32 events, so athletes from this category instead competed in class F51 against athletes with spinal cord disabilities.

Participating nations

Medal summary

Medal table

Men's events

Women's events

See also 
 Athletics at the 2000 Summer Olympics

References 

 

 
2000 Summer Paralympics events
2000
Paralympics